Bogue Cheely is a stream in the U.S. state of Mississippi.

Bogue Cheely is a name derived from the Choctaw language most likely meaning "branch or branches of a creek".

References

Rivers of Mississippi
Rivers of Jones County, Mississippi
Mississippi placenames of Native American origin